Beaconsfield–Baie-D'Urfé is a former borough in the West Island area of Montreal, Quebec. It was composed of the municipalities of Beaconsfield and Baie-D'Urfé through a forced merger on January 1, 2002.

On June 20, 2004, both Beaconsfield and Baie-D'Urfé voted to return to being independent municipalities, effective January 1, 2006.

See also
 List of former boroughs of Montreal
 Montreal Merger
 Municipal reorganization in Quebec

Former Montreal boroughs
Beaconsfield, Quebec

fr:Beaconsfield–Baie-D'Urfé